The SS Princess Anne was a Virginia Ferry Company (VFC) steam ship that plied the route across Chesapeake Bay between Little Creek, near Norfolk, and Kiptopeke Beach, at the southern end of the Eastern Shore of Virginia. She was known for her streamlined superstructure designed by Raymond Loewy, which attracted the attention of the newsreels and the nautical press.

In 1993, she was sunk as an artificial reef and scuba diving site off the coast of West Palm Beach, Florida.

History
The ship was designed by Raymond Loewy in 1933 for the Virginia Ferry Company, a subsidiary of the Pennsylvania Railroad for whom Loewy had done a great deal of design work. Using the hull of an older ferry from within the VFC's fleet as a basis, he created a streamlined superstructure that Christopher Innes has described as possibly influenced by Norman Bel Geddes' 1932 Streamlined Ocean Liner. The paintwork emphasized the sleek form with one unbroken line flowing from stem to stern.

The Princess Anne entered service on 9 July 1936, plying the route between Little Creek (then in Princess Anne County) and Kiptopeke Beach, Virginia, across the Chesapeake Bay, a distance of around 21 miles. The Nautical Gazette recorded the event under the headline "The Svelte "Princess Anne" Makes Her Debut", describing her as "ultra-modern". A Universal Newsreel showed her under way. In 1940, the Keystone Motorist described her, with the SS Delmarva, as one of "two of the largest motor transports in the world".

The ferry service across the Chesapeake Bay ended after the Chesapeake Bay Bridge–Tunnel opened in April 1964. Four of the seven ferries operated by the Virginia Ferry Company were acquired by the Delaware River and Bay Authority, including the Princess Anne which was renamed the SS New Jersey after which she traveled between Cape May, New Jersey and Lewes, Delaware.

A set of black and white photographs from 1940 showing migrant workers waiting to board at the Little Creek end of the ferry and travelling on board is in the collection of the Library of Congress.

In 1993, she was sunk off the coast of West Palm Beach, Florida, as an artificial reef and scuba diving site. She sits at a depth of approximately 100 feet and can be located at 26° 47.60' North latitude and 80° 00.20' West longitude.

Gallery
Pictures taken in 1937:

See also
 MV Kalakala

References

External links 
 

1936 ships
Ferries of Virginia
Raymond Loewy
Streamliners
Art Deco ships